The ITU Single Vegetative Obstruction Model is a Radio propagation model that quantitatively approximates the attenuation due to the vegetation in the middle of a telecommunication link.

Applicable to/under conditions

The model is applicable to scenarios where no end of the link is completely inside foliage, but a single plant or tree stands in the middle of the link.

Coverage

Frequency = Below 3 GHz and Over 5 GHz
Depth = Not specified

Mathematical formulations

The single vegetative obstruction model is formally expressed as,

where,
A = The Attenuation due to vegetation. Unit: decibel(dB).

d = Depth of foliage. Unit: Meter (m).

 = Specific attenuation for short vegetative paths. Unit: decibel per meter (dB/m).

Ri = The initial slope of the attenuation curve.

Rf = The final slope of the attenuation curve.

f = The frequency of operations. Unit: gigahertz (GHz).

k = Empirical constant.

Calculation of slopes

Initial slope is calculated as:

And the final slope as:

where,

a, b and c are empirical constants (given in the table below).

Calculation of k

k is computed as:

where,

k0 = Empirical constant (given in the table below).

Rf = Empirical constant for frequency dependent attenuation.

A0 = Empirical attenuation constant (given in the table below).

Ai = Illumination area.

Calculation of Ai

Ai is calculated in using any of the equations below. A point to note is that, the terms h, hT, hR,  w, wT and wR are defined perpendicular to the (assumed horizontal) line joining the transmitter and receiver. The first three terms are measured vertically and the other there are measured horizontally.

Equation 1: 

Equation 2: 

where,

wT = Width of illuminated area as seen from the transmitter. Unit: meter (m)

wR = Width of illuminated area as seen from the receiver. Unit: meter (m)

w = Width of the vegetation. Unit: meter (m)

hT =Height of illuminated area as seen from the transmitter. Unit: meter (m)

hR = Height of illuminated area as seen from the receiver. Unit: meter (m)

h = Height of the vegetation. Unit: meter (m)

aT = Azimuth beamwidth of the transmitter. Unit: degree or radian

aR = Azimuth beamwidth of the receiver. Unit: degree or radian

eT = Elevation beamwidth of the transmitter. Unit: degree or radian

eR = Elevation beamwidth of the receiver. Unit: degree or radian

dT = Distance of the vegetation from transmitter. Unit: meter(m)

dR = Distance of the vegetation from receiver. Unit: meter(m)

The empirical constants

Empirical constants a, b, c, k0, Rf and A0 are used as tabulated below.

Limitations

The model predicts the explicit path loss due to the existence of vegetation along the link. The total path loss includes other factors like free space loss which is not included in this model.

Over 5 GHz, the equations suddenly become extremely complex in consideration of the equations for below 3 GHz. Also, this model does not work for frequency between 3 GHz and 5 GHz.

See also

 Radio propagation model
 Weissberger's model
 Early ITU model

Further reading

 Introduction to RF propagation, John S. Seybold, 2005, Wiley.

Radio frequency propagation model